Ghana competed at the 2016 Summer Olympics in Rio de Janeiro, Brazil, from 5 to 21 August 2016. This was the nation's fourteenth appearance at the Summer Olympics, having taken part in all but three editions since its debut (as the Gold Coast) at the 1952 Summer Olympics. Ghana did not attend the 1976 Olympics because of the African boycott and did not attend the 1980 Olympics because of the United States boycott.

Ghana Olympic Committee sent the nation's largest delegation to the Games since 2004. A total of 14 athletes, seven per gender, were selected to the team for five different sports. Among the sports represented by the athletes, Ghana marked its Olympic debut in swimming, women's judo, and men's weightlifting.

Notable Ghanaian athletes on the squad were Hungarian-born judoka Szandra Szögedi, and freestyle swimmer Kaya Forson, who established a record as the youngest ever competitor (aged 14) in the nation's Olympic history. Javelin thrower John Ampomah was named the captain of the Ghanaian team, with track sprinter Flings Owusu-Agyapong leading the contingent as the nation's flag bearer in the opening ceremony.

Ghana, however, failed to earn a single medal in Rio de Janeiro, continuing a drought that began at the 1992 Summer Olympics in Barcelona, where the men's football team earned the bronze.

Athletics (track and field)
 
Ghanaian athletes achieved qualifying standards in the following athletics events (up to a maximum of 3 athletes in each event):

Track & road events
Men

Women

Field events

Boxing
 
Ghana entered one boxer to compete in the men's bantamweight division into the Olympic competition. Abdul Omar received an unused Olympic spot as the next highest-ranked boxer at the 2016 African Boxing Olympic Qualification Tournament, as runner-up Mohamed Hamout of Morocco decided to accept his place instead in the World Series of Boxing (WSB) rankings.

Judo

Ghana qualified one judoka for the women's half-middleweight category (63 kg) at the Games. Hungarian-born Szandra Szögedi earned a continental quota spot from the African region as Ghana's top-ranked judoka outside of direct qualifying position in the IJF World Ranking List of May 30, 2016.

Swimming

Ghana received a Universality invitation from FINA to send two swimmers (one male and one female) to the Olympics, signifying the nation's Olympic debut in the sport.

Weightlifting

Ghana qualified one male weightlifter for the Rio Olympics by virtue of a top five national finish at the 2016 African Championships. The team allocated this place to 17-year-old Christian Amoah.

See also
Ghana at the 2016 Summer Paralympics

References

External links

 
 

Nations at the 2016 Summer Olympics
2016
Olympics